Kifikalani Cabrera (born October 7, 1995) is an American soccer player who currently plays as a goalkeeper for Los Angeles Force in the National Independent Soccer Association.

Career

College and amateur
Cabrera played college soccer at Long Beach City College in both 2013 and 2014.

Following college, Cabrera played in the United Premier Soccer League with LA Wolves and California United Strikers.

Professional
In September 2019, Cabrera signed for NISA side California United Strikers ahead of the league's inaugural season.

In March 2021, Cabrera joined Los Angeles Force ahead of the 2021 season.

References

External links
 Profile at Long Beach Community College
 California United profile

1995 births
Living people
American soccer players
Association football goalkeepers
California United Strikers FC players
National Independent Soccer Association players
United Premier Soccer League players
Long Beach City College alumni
Junior college men's soccer players in the United States
People from Paramount, California
Sportspeople from Los Angeles County, California
Soccer players from California